Lebanon competed at the 2022 Winter Olympics in Beijing, China, from 4 to 20 February 2022.

The Lebanese delegation consisted of three athletes (two men and one woman) competing in two sports. Cesar Arnouk and Manon Ouaiss were the country's flagbearer during the opening ceremony. Meanwhile a volunteer was the flagbearer during the closing ceremony.

Competitors
The following is the list of number of competitors participating at the Games per sport/discipline.

Alpine skiing

By meeting the basic qualification standards Lebanon qualified one male and one female alpine skier.

Cross-country skiing

By meeting the basic qualification standards Lebanon qualified one male cross-country skier.

Distance

Sprint

References

Nations at the 2022 Winter Olympics
2022
2022 in Lebanese sport